Nawada is a city and municipality in Bihar, India. It may also refer to:

 Nawada district, Bihar, India
 Nawada railway station
 Nawada (Lok Sabha constituency)
 Nawada (Vidhan Sabha constituency)
 Nawada (Saharanpur), a village in the Saharanpur District of Uttar Pradesh State, India
 Nawada metro station, a rapid transit station of the Delhi Metro

See also
 Navada (disambiguation)